Asperton is a village in Lincolnshire, England.

External links

Villages in Lincolnshire
Borough of Boston